David Alan Robinson (born 14 January 1965) is an English former footballer who played as a central defender in the Football League for Hartlepool United, Halifax Town, Peterborough United and Notts County.

Born in Haverton Hill in County Durham, Robinson made 236 appearances in the Football League, scoring 12 goals, before joining Corby Town in 1994. He went on to play for Ilkeston Town and Gresley Rovers, ending his career at King's Lynn.

References

1965 births
Living people
People from Haverton Hill
Footballers from County Durham
English footballers
Association football central defenders
Billingham Town F.C. players
Hartlepool United F.C. players
Halifax Town A.F.C. players
Peterborough United F.C. players
Notts County F.C. players
Corby Town F.C. players
Ilkeston Town F.C. players
Gresley F.C. players
King's Lynn F.C. players
English Football League players